Events from the year 1846 in art.

Events
Edward Lear publishes Illustrated Excursions to Italy and is made Drawing Master to Queen Victoria.
The Wellington Statue by Matthew Cotes Wyatt is erected at its original location in London's Hyde Park Corner.

Works

Ivan Aivazovsky – Battle of Navarino
Thomas Cole – Catskill Landscape
William Etty – Musidora: The Bather 'At the Doubtful Breeze Alarmed' (Tate Britain version)
Jean-Léon Gérôme – Young Greeks at a Cockfight
Louis Hersent – Portrait of Delphine Gay
Edward Hicks – Noah's Ark
John Everett Millais – Pizarro Seizing the Inca of Peru (Tate Britain)
Jean-François Millet – Prometheus Unbound
Rembrandt Peale – Self-portrait
Eliseo Sala – Pia de' Tolomei
Giovanni Strazza – Ishmael Abandoned in the Desert (completed).
George Frederic Watts – Paolo and Francesca

Births
March 17 – Kate Greenaway, English illustrator (died 1901)
May 3 – Sir Edmund Elton, 8th Baronet, English studio potter (died 1920)
May 21 – Luc-Olivier Merson, French painter (died 1920)
October 14 – Albert Schickedanz, Austro-Hungarian architect and painter in the Eclectic style (died 1915)
October 28 – Albert Dubois-Pillet, French Neo-impressionist painter (died 1890)
November 3 – Elizabeth Thompson, British painter (died 1933)
December 9 – John Macallan Swan, English painter and sculptor (died 1910)

Deaths
January 22 – Louis-Pierre Baltard, French architect and engraver (born 1764)
 April 16 – Christian Duttenhofer, German engraver (born 1778)
June 8 – Rodolphe Töpffer, Swiss painter and cartoonist (born 1799)
June 22 – Benjamin Haydon, English historical painter and writer (born 1786; suicide)
July 16 – Vasily Demut-Malinovsky, Russian sculptor in the Empire style (born 1779)
August 11 – Bartolomé Montalvo, Spanish painter specializing in landscapes, hunted animals and still lifes (born 1769)
August 12 – John Caspar Wild, Swiss-born American landscape painter and lithographer (born 1804)
October 5 – Henri van der Haert, Belgian portrait painter, sculptor, illustrator and engraver (born 1790)
December 12 – Charles Alexandre Lesueur, French artist and explorer (born 1778)
date unknown – Pál Balkay, Hungarian painter and teacher (born 1785)

References

 
Years of the 19th century in art
1840s in art